The 19th Regiment Indiana Volunteer Infantry was an infantry regiment that served in the Union Army during the American Civil War. It was one of the original regiments in the Army of the Potomac's Iron Brigade.

Service
The 19th Indiana was raised at Indianapolis, Indiana, on July 29, 1861. It saw severe fighting in the 1862 Northern Virginia Campaign. In their first battle at Gainesville, the 19th supported the left flank of the embattled 2nd Wisconsin, fighting Confederates near the buildings of John Brawner's Farm. They also fought in the main part of the Second Battle of Bull Run, where they, along with the rest of the Iron Brigade, were part of the rear guard covering the retreat of Union Army General John Pope, the 19th would lose 260 men out of 430 engaged.  During the subsequent Maryland Campaign, the 19th attacked Turner's Gap in the Battle of South Mountain, and then suffered considerable casualties battling Hood's Texas Brigade in the D.R. Miller cornfield at Antietam. Lieutenant Colonel Alois O. Bachman was mortally wounded during the engagement, leaving command of the regiment to captain William W. Dudley, the 19th would lose 12 men killed and 59 wounded.  

During the first day of the Battle of Gettysburg on July 1, 1863, the 19th pushed a part of James J. Archer's Confederate brigade off McPherson's Ridge, and capturing a number of them in the progress. The 19th would bare the brunt of a Confederate counterattack in the late afternoon, but held their ground stubbornly. The flag would fall multiple times, and the entire color guard succumbing to bullets. Lieutenant Colonel William Dudley would be wounded during the fire fight. The Hoosiers would gradually give ground and then fall back with the Brigade, when the I Corps retreated to Cemetery Hill. The Iron Brigade and the 19th Indiana were sent over to nearby Culp's Hill, where they entrenched. They saw comparatively little action the rest of the battle. Out of 288 men, the 19th would leave Gettysburg with but 78 men present for duty. The regiment later served that year in the Bristoe and Mine Run Campaigns and in 1864 during the Overland Campaign and the Siege of Petersburg.

The regiment was amalgamated with the 20th Indiana Infantry on October 18, 1864.

Casualties
The 19th Indiana suffered 5 Officers and 194 enlisted men killed in battle or died from wounds, 1 officer and 116 enlisted men dead from disease for a total of 316 fatalities.

Commanders
 Colonel Solomon Meredith
 Colonel Samuel J. Williams

In fiction
Lucas McCain of The Rifleman served as a lieutenant in the 19th Indiana during the war. This background was dealt with during an episode where McCain takes in a wounded southern veteran.

Deputy U.S. Marshals Eli Flynn and William Henry Washington from According to Hoyle by Abigail Roux both served in the 19th Indiana during the war, and then later served in the Indian Wars, before becoming Marshals together.  Washington, at least, still carries his army-issued Colt .44 from when he served with the Iron Brigade.

George McLain, Chester Gerber and J.F. Turner in The Fourth of July trilogy are members of the Indiana 19th and the Iron Brigade.

See also

 List of Indiana Civil War regiments
 Indiana in the Civil War
 Iron Brigade

Notes

References
 Gaff, Alan D., "On Many a Bloody Field: Four Years In The Iron Brigade", Indiana University Press, 1996, .
The Civil War Archive

19
Iron Brigade
1861 establishments in Indiana
Military units and formations established in 1861
Military units and formations disestablished in 1864
1864 disestablishments in Indiana